Rudolf Corn (30 September 1943) is a German footballer who spent most of his career in Yugoslavia.

Club career
Born in Saalfeld, Germany, he played as forward or attacking midfielder. Corn spent most of his career with Slovenian club NK Olimpija Ljubljana where he played for eight straight seasons, between 1962 and 1970. The first three seasons he played in Yugoslav Second League, and, after Olimpija got promotion in 1965, the other five in the Yugoslav First League. He played with Olimpija in the 1966–67 Inter-Cities Fairs Cup. In 1970, he left Yugoslavia and moved to France where he played two seasons with Stade Poitevin.

References

1943 births
Living people
People from Saalfeld
German footballers
Slovenian footballers
Yugoslav footballers
Association football forwards
Association football midfielders
NK Olimpija Ljubljana (1945–2005) players
Yugoslav First League players
Expatriate footballers in Yugoslavia
Stade Poitevin FC players
Ligue 2 players
Expatriate footballers in France
Footballers from Thuringia